Yoshitaka Saitō (born February 18, 1963, in Aichi Prefecture, Japan) is a Japanese politician who has served as a member of the House of Councillors of Japan since 2010. He represents the Aichi at-large district and is a member of the Democratic Party of Japan.

Early life 
Saito was born Nagoya city, in the ward of Nakamura. He graduated from Nagoya Municipal Kikuzato High School in 1981, and graduated from the Aichi University of Education in 1985. He was an elementary school teacher prior to his election to the House of Councillors.

References 

1963 births
Politicians from Aichi Prefecture
Aichi University of Education alumni
People from Nagoya
Living people
Democratic Party of Japan politicians
Democratic Party (Japan, 2016) politicians
Constitutional Democratic Party of Japan politicians
Members of the House of Councillors (Japan)
Japanese schoolteachers
Japanese trade unionists